Konstantin Savtchichkine (born 15 November 1973) is a Russian judoka.

Achievements

External links 

1973 births
Living people
Russian male judoka
Judoka at the 1996 Summer Olympics
Olympic judoka of Russia
Universiade medalists in judo
Universiade silver medalists for Russia
Medalists at the 1999 Summer Universiade
20th-century Russian people